James Hayward Harlow is an electrical engineer working for Harlow Engineering Associates in Mentone, Alabama. He was named a Fellow of the Institute of Electrical and Electronics Engineers (IEEE) in 2013 for his leadership in IEEE technical and standardization committees on transformer technology.

References

20th-century births
Living people
American electrical engineers
Fellow Members of the IEEE
Year of birth missing (living people)
Place of birth missing (living people)